Costin Georgian is a metro station in Bucharest; it was opened on 28 December 1981 as part of the second phase of Line 1 between Timpuri Noi and Republica.
Formerly named Muncii after the eponymous boulevard that run just north (now Basarabia Blvd.), the station was chosen in 1992 to honor the late engineer Costin Georgian, General Manager of the Metro operator Metrorex, after his sudden death on 25 August 1992, the eve of the Basarab station opening day.

References

Bucharest Metro stations
Railway stations opened in 1981
1981 establishments in Romania